This is the list of notable stars in the constellation Crater, sorted by decreasing brightness.

References

List
Crater